West Willow is an unincorporated community in Pequea Township in Lancaster County, Pennsylvania, United States. West Willow is located at the intersection of Millwood Road and West Willow Road to the west of Willow Street.

References

Unincorporated communities in Lancaster County, Pennsylvania
Unincorporated communities in Pennsylvania